Mary Frances Thérèse Raftery (21 December 1957 – 10 January 2012) was an Irish investigative journalist, filmmaker and writer.

Raftery was born in Dublin. She started her investigative journalism career with In Dublin magazine in the 1970s, before moving on to Magill Magazine and then to Raidió Teilifís Éireann (RTÉ) in 1984. Her documentary series States of Fear was broadcast on the Irish television channel Raidió Teilifís Éireann (RTÉ) in 1999. A book she wrote later that year called Suffer the Little Children added more detail to her claim that the Irish childcare system between the 1930s and 1970s was guilty of widespread persecution and abuse. In 2000, the Commission to Inquire into Child Abuse was established by the Irish Government to examine the evidence: its Report was published in May 2009. Her programme "Cardinal Secrets" was broadcast as a Prime Time special on RTÉ in 2002. It led to the setting up of the Murphy Commission of Investigation into clerical abuse in the Dublin Archdiocese which published the Murphy Report in 2009.

She was nominated for "NNI National Journalist of the Year" in 2011 for her work in exposing clerical abuse of children.

Raftery died of ovarian cancer at St. Vincent's University Hospital on 10 January 2012, aged 54. An Article that appeared in February 2012 in The Irish Times referred to her as "the most important journalist of the past 30 years".

Writing

References

External links
 Mary Raftery Journalism Fund

1957 births
2012 deaths
20th-century Irish people
21st-century Irish people
Deaths from ovarian cancer
Deaths from cancer in the Republic of Ireland
Irish columnists
Irish film directors
Irish women film directors
Irish non-fiction writers
Irish women non-fiction writers
Irish television directors
People educated at St Conleth's College
Irish television producers
Irish women journalists
The Irish Times people
Magill people
RTÉ people
Critics of the Catholic Church
Irish women columnists
Women television producers
Women television directors